Outlaws of the Orient is a 1937 American adventure film directed by Ernest B. Schoedsack.

Cast
Jack Holt ... Chet Eaton
Mae Clarke	... Joan Manning
Harold Huber ... Gen. Ho-Fang
Ray Walker ... Lucky Phelps
James Bush ... Johnny Eaton
Joseph Crehan ... Snyder
Beatrice Roberts 	... Alice

External links

1937 films
1937 adventure films
American black-and-white films
Films set in China
American adventure films
1930s American films